ACCURATE (A Center for Correct, Usable, Reliable, Auditable, and Transparent Elections) was established in 2005 by a group of computer scientists, psychologists and policy experts to address problems with electronic voting. The organization was funded by NSF thru 2012, and published research and reference materials about electronic voting for use by policy makers, vendors, the elections community and the general public.

See also 
 Avi Rubin
 Peter G. Neumann
 David A. Wagner
 Douglas W. Jones
 Voting machine

References

External links 
 
 NSF press release August 15 2005 announcing grant funding ACCURATE

Organizations established in 2005
Election technology
Electronic voting organizations